Deus Le Volt is the eighth in the series of Time Hunter novellas and features the characters Honoré Lechasseur and Emily Blandish from Daniel O'Mahony's Doctor Who novella The Cabinet of Light. It is written by Jon de Burgh Miller, co-author of the Virgin Publishing Bernice Summerfield novel Twilight of the Gods and author of the BBC Books Past Doctor Adventure Dying in the Sun.

The novella is also available in a limited edition hardback, signed by the author.

The series is informally connected to the Whoniverse, as it includes the Fendahl, which originally appeared in the Doctor Who television story Image of the Fendahl and in a number of sequels.

External links
 Telos Publishing - Deus Le Volt
 Deus Le Volt at Internet Archive

Time Hunter
2006 British novels
Novels by Jon de Burgh Miller
British science fiction novels
British novellas
Telos Publishing books